James Emery may refer to:

 James Emery (musician) (born 1951), American jazz guitarist
 James Emery (missionary) (died 1999), missionary in Guatemala with the Presbyterian Church
 Sir James Frederick Emery (1886–1983), British Member of Parliament for Salford West
 James L. Emery (born 1931), American politician from New York
 Jim Emery (born 1934), American politician in the South Dakota House of Representatives

See also
 James Emery Paster (1945–1989), American serial killer
 James Emery White (born 1961), American theologian